The Miss Universe Germany 2014 pageant was held on August 31, 2014. This year only 15 candidates were competing for the national crown. Each delegate represents a states and regions of the country. The chosen  was Josefin Donat now she will represent Germany at the Miss Universe 2014. The winner of best national costume, the costume will be use in Miss Universe 2014.

Final Results

Official Delegates

External links
Official Website

2014